Maniac Cop is a 1988 American action slasher film directed by William Lustig, written by Larry Cohen, and starring Tom Atkins, Bruce Campbell, Laurene Landon, Richard Roundtree, William Smith, Robert Z'Dar, and Sheree North. Z'Dar plays the title character, a murderous ex-police officer returned from the dead, and seeks revenge on the people who wronged him. It is the first installment in the Maniac Cop film series. Maniac Cop was released on May 13, 1988 and grossed $671,382 worldwide on a budget of $1.1 million. The film was followed by two sequels, Maniac Cop 2 (1990) and Maniac Cop III: Badge of Silence (1993).

Plot 
In New York City, a waitress on her way home is assaulted by two muggers and seeks aid from a police officer, who breaks her neck. Over the next two nights, this "Maniac Cop" commits more murders, prompting Lieutenant McCrae, who was told by his superiors to suppress eyewitness accounts that the killer was wearing a police uniform, to pass on information to a journalist, in an attempt to protect civilians. This causes panic and dissent among the city, and results in innocent patrolmen either being shot to death or avoided on the streets by people afraid of them being the Maniac Cop.

Ellen Forrest, suspecting that her husband Jack may be the Maniac Cop, follows him to a motel and catches him in bed with fellow officer Theresa Mallory. Distraught, Ellen runs out of the room, and is slain by the killer. Jack is arrested under suspicion of murder, but McCrae believes Jack has been framed. McCrae gets Jack to tell him about his relationship with Mallory, who is attacked by the Maniac Cop while working undercover as a prostitute. Mallory and McCrae fight off the killer, who is deathly cold even through his gloves and does not appear to breathe; when they shoot him several times, the killer appears unfazed.

Mallory hides out in McCrae's apartment while he investigates Sally Noland, the only person Mallory told about her affair. McCrae follows Noland to a warehouse, where she meets with the Maniac Cop and refers to him as "Matt". Returning to police headquarters, McCrae discovers files on Matthew Cordell, an officer who was unjustly imprisoned in Sing Sing for police brutality and closing in on corruption in city hall. He was mutilated and killed in a shower room in Sing Sing by other inmates, whom he helped incarcerate.

When McCrae and Mallory visit Jack, they tell him they think Cordell is the real killer and plan to visit the chief medical examiner at Sing Sing. McCrae leaves to go to the clerical room, and he is attacked by Sally, who is convinced that Cordell is going to turn on her. After finding an officer hanging from the ceiling, Sally is beaten to death by Cordell. Hearing the commotion, Jack and Mallory leave the interrogation room and find the corpses of numerous officers strewn about the halls of the building. Mallory goes to McCrae's car while Jack searches for Cordell, who disappears after throwing McCrae out a window, killing him. Jack, who looks like the one responsible for the carnage to responding officers, flees with Mallory.

The two go to see Sing Sing's medical examiner, who admits that while he was preparing to autopsy Cordell, the officer showed faint signs of life. The examiner secretly released Cordell into Sally's care, convinced he was completely brain-dead. During the 50th annual St. Patrick's Day parade, Jack waits outside as Mallory warns Commissioner Pike and Captain Ripley about Cordell, but the two refuse to believe her and have her arrested. Cordell appears and fatally stabs Pike and Ripley, then targets Mallory, knifing the policeman left to guard her. Mallory escapes through a window, while Jack is arrested and placed in a van, which Cordell hijacks.

Mallory and another officer chase the van, which Cordell takes to his warehouse hideout. Cordell attacks Mallory and Jack, kills the other officer, and tries to escape in the van when backup arrives. Jacks clings to the side of the van and fights for control of it, causing Cordell to drive into a suspended pipe, which impales him. Cordell loses control of the vehicle, which crashes into the river, and sinks. Afterwards, the van is fished out, and, as it is searched, Cordell's hand emerges from the water.

Later in the extended version, the mayor, confident that Cordell is dead, relaxes in his office. After the mayor's assistant leaves the office, Cordell silently appears from behind the curtain and murders the mayor as revenge for framing him.

Cast 

 Bruce Campbell as Officer Jack W. Forrest Jr.
 Tom Atkins as Lieutenant Frank McCrae
 Laurene Landon as Officer Theresa Mallory
 Robert Z'Dar as Officer Matt Cordell / The Maniac Cop
 Richard Roundtree as Commissioner Pike
 William Smith as Captain Ripley
 Ken Lerner as Mayor Jerry Killium
 Victoria Catlin as Ellen Forrest
 Sheree North as Officer Sally Noland
 Rocky Giordani as Officer Fowler
 Nina Arvesen as Regina Sheperd
 William Lustig as Motel Manager (uncredited)
 Sam Raimi as News Reporter (uncredited)
 Jake LaMotta as Detective Motta (uncredited)

Release

Theatrical 
Maniac Cop was released May 13, 1988. It played in 50 theaters and had a U.S. gross of $671,382.

Home media 
The film was first released on DVD on April 8, 1998, by Elite Entertainment and included a commentary by director William Lustig, writer Larry Cohen, star Bruce Campbell, and composer Jay Chattaway as well as a trailer and deleted scenes. This was released on DVD by Shriek Show in April 8, 2002. Later, on November 14, 2006, a "special edition" DVD was released by Synapse Films. This version includes the film restored and re-mastered with a DTS soundtrack. In October 2011, Synapse Films released a Blu-ray edition of the film.

Reception 
Rotten Tomatoes reports that 53% of 15 surveyed critics gave the film a positive review; the average rating was 5/10. The film was mostly panned by critics at the time of its release. Variety called it a "disappointing thriller that wastes an oddball premise".  Caryn James of The New York Times called it an amateurish film with stiff acting and dialogue.  Chris Willman of the Los Angeles Times wrote that film quickly becomes an uninteresting Friday the 13th clone. Time Out London criticized the film as formulaic and said that it might have been better had writer-producer Cohen directed it himself. Richard Harrington of The Washington Post called the script "undernourished and obvious".

Reviewing the Blu-ray release, J. Hurtado of Twitch Film wrote that despite its faults, Maniac Cop deserves mention as one of the last grindhouse films set in New York City. Tom Becker of DVD Verdict called it "a fun, mindless gorefest". Bill Gibron of DVD Talk rated it 4.5/5 stars and called it "one of the era's finest forgotten gems", deserving of a critical reappraisal.  Noel Murray of The A.V. Club rated it B- and called it a goofy film that was always meant to inhabit the shelves of independent video rental stores.  Gareth Jones of Dread Central rated it four out of five stars and called it a cult film that is "amongst the cream of the crop of late-eighties low-budget horror". Bloody Disgusting rated it five out of ten stars and questioned why the film has a cult following when it has a poor script and direction, uneven tone, and boring kills.

Campbell said of the film that it was "not a good movie" when viewed in hindsight, but it initially struck him as "perfectly legit".

Legacy

Sequels 
The film was followed by two sequels, Maniac Cop 2 in 1990, and Maniac Cop III: Badge of Silence in 1993.

Remake 
In 2017, it was rumored that there would be a Maniac Cop remake in the works. As of November 2018, the remake is still being developed and will have a completely different tone from the first film.

Television 
In October 2019, HBO and Canal+ picked up a Maniac Cop TV series that will be executive produced by Nicolas Winding Refn, through his production company by NWR Originals, and John Hyams, who will also direct the pilot.

In popular media 
The Maniac Cop film series and Robert Z'Dar were mentioned in the song "Two Trucks" by Internet comedian Neil Cicierega.

References

External links 
 
 

1988 films
1988 horror films
1980s action thriller films
1980s crime thriller films
1980s horror thriller films
1988 independent films
1980s mystery films
1980s serial killer films
1980s slasher films
American action thriller films
American independent films
American crime thriller films
American supernatural horror films
Holiday horror films
American action horror films
Adultery in films
American films about revenge
Films set in New York City
Films shot in New York City
Films shot in Los Angeles
Films about the New York City Police Department
Fictional portrayals of the New York City Police Department
American police detective films
American slasher films
Supernatural slasher films
Films directed by William Lustig
American serial killer films
Saint Patrick's Day films
Films scored by Jay Chattaway
Maniac Cop (film series)
Films with screenplays by Larry Cohen
1980s English-language films
1980s American films